HSC Max Mols is a high speed catamaran launched on 1 December 1997 at the Incat shipyard in Tasmania. She has spent the majority of her career serving the Aarhus-Odden route with Mols Linien. She has frequently been chartered to other operators in the Baltic Sea and English Channel.

Initially chartered to Cat-Link as Cat-Link IV she entered service between Århus and Kalundborg in May 1998. The following January her charter passed to Mols Linien and she was thus renamed Max Mols, entering service on her standing Århus-Odden route in April 1999. She has since had three major charters each for the summer seasons of 2000, 2002 and 2004 before returning to Denmark. In 2000 she operated between North Sydney and Channel-Port aux Basques for Marine Atlantic, in 2002 she was chartered to Riga Sea Line for a route between Riga and Nynäshamn and her final charter was to P&O Ferries as the Max Mols (Caen Express) operating a high speed service between Portsmouth and Caen, returning to Mols Linien at the end of October. Since 2004, she has continued operating the  Århus-Odden route as before.

Sister ships
Max Mols is one of four 91 metre wave piercing catamarans built by Incat.

References

Ferries of the United Kingdom
Ferries of France
Ships built by Incat
1998 ships